The WIEN2k package is a computer program written in Fortran which performs quantum mechanical calculations on periodic solids. It uses the full-potential (linearized) augmented plane-wave and local-orbitals [FP-(L)APW+lo] basis set to solve the Kohn–Sham equations of density functional theory.

WIEN2k was originally developed by Peter Blaha and Karlheinz Schwarz from the Institute of Materials Chemistry of the Vienna University of Technology. The first public release of the code was done in 1990. Then, the next releases were WIEN93, WIEN97, and WIEN2k. The latest version WIEN2k_21.1 was released on 14 April 2021.  It has been licensed by more than 3400 user groups and has about 16000 citations on Google scholar (Blaha WIEN2k).

WIEN2k uses density functional theory to calculate the electronic structure of a solid. It is based on the most accurate scheme for the calculation of the bond structure-the full potential energy (linear) augmented plane wave ((L) APW) + local orbit (lo) method. Local (spin) density approximation (LDA) or generalized gradient approximation (GGA) can be used in density universal information. WIEN2k uses an all-electronic solution, including relativistic influences

Features and Calculated Properties:
Calculate solid properties. 
Bond energy and density of states, electron density and spin density, X-ray structure factor, Bader’s "atoms in a molecule" thought, total energy, force, balance structure, structure optimization, molecular dynamics, electric field gradient, isomer displacement , Hyperfine field, spin polarization (ferromagnetic and antiferromagnetic structures), spin-orbit coupling, X-ray emission and absorption spectra, electron energy loss spectra. 
Calculate the optical properties of solids. 
Fermi surfaces.
LDA, GGA, meta-GGA, LDA+U, orbital polarization. 
Centrosymmetric and non-centrosymmetric lattice, with 230 built-in space groups.
Graphical user interface and user guide.
User-friendly environment W2web (WIEN to WEB) can easily generate and modify input files. It can also help users perform various tasks (such as electron density, density of states, etc.).

See also 
List of quantum chemistry and solid state physics software

References

External links 
WIEN2k homepage

Computational chemistry software
Density functional theory software
Physics software